The United States ambassador to Bangladesh is the official representative of the president of the United States to the head of state of Bangladesh. President Joe Biden nominated career diplomat and Acting Assistant Secretary of State for Economic and Business Affairs Peter D. Haas for the position on June 9, 2021; he was confirmed on December 18, 2021.

The United States officially recognized Bangladesh after its independence. In May 1972, the United States government opened its establishment and diplomatic residence with Bangladesh. In December 1972, the nation established its new constitution.
The embassy in Dhaka was established on May 18, 1972, with Herbert D. Spivack as Chargé d’Affaires ad interim. Daniel O. Newberry served as Chargé d’Affaires ad interim, October 1972–April 1974. The first ranking ambassador arrived in April 1974. Relations have been continuous and developing since that time.

The United States Embassy in Bangladesh is located in Madani Avenue, Baridhara, Dhaka.

Ambassadors

President Nixon appointed Hermann F. Eilts as ambassador on September 11, 1972, but Eilts declined the appointment. The U.S. Ambassador to Bangladesh holds the title Ambassador Extraordinary and Plenipotentiary

See also
 Bangladesh – United States relations
 Embassy of the United States, Dhaka
 Foreign relations of Bangladesh
 Ambassadors of the United States

Notes

References
 United States Department of State: Background notes on Bangladesh

External links
 United States Department of State: Chiefs of Mission for Bangladesh
 United States Department of State: Bangladesh
 United States Embassy in Dhaka

Bangladesh

United States